Dubasiyin is an ethnic group of more than 50,000 persons in Sudan. This ethnic group speaks Sudanese Arabic. They are part of the Arab, Sudan people cluster. The primary religion practiced by the Dubasiyin is Islam.

External links 
People Groups on this people

Ethnic groups in Sudan
Muslim communities in Africa